Suhl station is a railway station in Suhl, Thuringia, Germany.

References

Railway stations in Thuringia
Buildings and structures in Suhl
Railway stations in Germany opened in 1882